William Ivens (June 28, 1878 – June 20, 1957) was a religious and political figure in Manitoba, Canada.  He was a leading figure in the Winnipeg General Strike, and subsequently served as a Labour member of the Manitoba legislature from 1920 to 1936.

Personal life 
Ivens was born in Barford, in Warwickshire, England, to William Ivens and Sarah Willis. He then immigrated to Canada in 1896 when he was 16.  Ivens was educated at Wesley College, Winnipeg and was greatly influenced by Reverend Salem Bland. He graduated from Wesley College in 1906 with a Bachelor of Arts, then in 1907 with a Bachelor of Divinity. Ivens attended the University of Manitoba in 1909, gaining a Master of Arts degree in political economy and becoming an ordained minister in the Methodist Church.

On July 7, 1908, William Ivens and Louisa Davis wed. In 1910, their son Milton Herbert Ivens was born.

Career

Ministerial career 
Ivens began his ministerial career at a time when the social gospel was on the rise in Canada.  He was stationed at the McDougall Methodist Church in Winnipeg in 1916, and called for the church to lead the labour movement in its struggle against the prevailing tendencies of North American capitalism.

In 1917 and 1918, Ivens was opposed by several members of his congregation by defending conscientious objectors to World War I and criticizing the management of the war.  He expressed these opinions as a private citizen in newspaper articles, rather than from his pulpit; nevertheless, many church members opposed him as insufficiently patriotic in wartime.

Although there were several petitions presented in Ivens' favour (he had improved the financial status of McDougall during his time as its minister), the overseeing body removed him from the church in June 1918 in an effort to restore local unity.  Ivens agreed to stand down on condition that he be granted a year's leave to establish a "workers' church".  Before the end of the month, he had founded the first Labour Church in the City of Winnipeg.

Labour Church Leader 
June 30, 1918 marked the start of the Labour church as soon to be members gathered at the Winnipeg Labor Temple to discuss the possibility of a church for workers, pro-labour progressives and disgruntled church members. This church was created to preach information relevant to the working class. It was here where Ivens became the minister for this Labour church.

Ivens was directly involved in labour activism during this period.  He supported the newly organized Dominion Labour Party, and attempted to build local networks of support in a speaking tour of western Canada.  Upon his return to Winnipeg, he assumed the editorship of the Western Labour News, a newspaper published by the Winnipeg Trades and Labour Council.

Participation in the Winnipeg General Strike 
Ivens continued as editor of the Western Labour News during the Winnipeg General Strike of 1919, and published a Daily Strike Bulletin during this period.  He wrote numerous articles in support of the strikers. Reverend Ivens preached services of his church in the park every Sunday for the six weeks of the strike. Within these services strike news would be relayed along with the prayers.  Although he warned against public disorder, he also referred to the strike as the harbinger of a new age for the working-class in Canada.  His Labour Church soon became the scene of extremely large meetings, with crowds growing up to 7,000 listeners.

When the Canadian government suppressed the strike in June 1919, Ivens was arrested on charges of seditious libel and conspiracy during an overnight raid on the 17th of June.  James Shaver Woodsworth took over Ivens positions following the arrest. Although it is unlikely that his editorials actually constituted sedition by the standards of the age, on March 28, 1920, he was found guilty and given a year in prison. Ivens was then sent to Stony Mountain Penitentiary.

Political career 
While still in prison, Ivens ran as a candidate of the Dominion Labour Party (DLP) in the provincial election of 1920, and was elected in the city of Winnipeg.  Winnipeg, at the time, elected ten members by preferential balloting; Ivens finished fifth on the first count and was declared elected on the second after receiving transfers from DLP leader Fred Dixon.

In late 1920, the DLP split into two factions via a fallout over the Winnipeg General Strike.  Dixon, Ivens, Woodsworth and most others on the left of the DLP founded the new Independent Labour Party of Manitoba (ILP) in November 1920.

He was re-elected in the provincial election of 1922, but was reduced to fourth place among the successful social democratic candidates and was not assured of re-election until the final count.

In addition to his political career, Ivens also received a chiropractor's certificate in 1925 and practiced in the field.

Ivens was re-elected in the elections of 1927 and 1932, though again trailing other successful social democratic candidates.  He lost his seat in the provincial election of 1936.  In 1940, Ivens ran unsuccessfully as an Ontario Cooperative Commonwealth Federation (CCF) candidate in the federal Kenora—Rainy River riding. He attempted a comeback in the election of 1941 as a candidate of the Manitoba Cooperative Commonwealth Federation, but was unsuccessful.

Ivens remained active in the CCF after leaving the legislature but never held a seat.

Death and legacy 
He died on June 20, 1957 in Chula Vista, California, at the age of 78. Ivens was interred in Elmwood Cemetery in Winnipeg, on July 12, 1957.

Ivens worked to create a better life for the working class of Manitoba. He preached within his Labour Church, supported strikers and worked as a politician to make change.

References

Further reading

 
 
 

1878 births
1958 deaths
20th-century Canadian politicians
Canadian anti-capitalists
Canadian chiropractors
Canadian Christian socialists
Independent Labour Party (Manitoba, 1920) MLAs
Manitoba Co-operative Commonwealth Federation MLAs
Methodist socialists
People from Barford, Warwickshire
People of the Winnipeg general strike
English emigrants to Canada